Nora Dunblane (born 1879) was an American actress and short story writer.

Early life and education
Nora Dunblane was born in Brooklyn. She attended Miss Rounds' School and the American Academy of Dramatic Arts (graduating in 1899), and was involved with the Brooklyn Cantata Club.

After graduating, she was active in the American Academy of Dramatic Arts alumni society, and served on its library committee in 1904, with elocutionist Helena Zachos.

Stage career
Dunblane was a "clever young American actress" on Broadway at the turn into the 20th century, often seen in soubrette roles. Dunblane's stage credits included roles in Cyrano de Bergerac (1898) with Richard Mansfield, Hearts are Trumps (1900), The Cuckoo (1900), Her Majesty (1900), Lovers' Lane (1901), Her Atonement (1899 and 1901), The Worst Woman in London (1903), Much Ado About Nothing (1903), His Sister's Shame (1903), and Don Carlos (1905).

In 1900, she performed in an all-star benefit at Carnegie Hall, raising funds for Roman Catholic orphanages.

Writing
Dunblane was a writer during and after her acting days. Her short fiction, often romance stories, appeared in magazines and newspapers, with titles including "The Girl in the Bookshop" (1903), "Beating the Game" (1907), "Studio Number Six: The Story of a Musician" (1907), "Romance at Ryerson's" (1908), "Two Ways of Love" (1912), "Love's Command" (1913), "Otilla's Triumph" (1914), "The White Gardenia" (1915), "The Girl Who Was Charming" (1915), and "Jasmine's Decision" (1915).

In culture
The band Tommy McClymont & The Panacea Jamband recorded a song, "Nora Dunblane", about the actress, on their album May the Ladies Treat You Kindly (2016). (McClymont is from Dunblane, Scotland, and was inspired to write the song by a photograph of the actress.)

References

American actresses
American women writers
1879 births
Year of death missing
20th-century deaths